Ivan Mitchell Raimi, D.O. (born June 21, 1956) is an American emergency medicine physician and screenwriter, and a brother of filmmaker Sam Raimi and actor Ted Raimi. Ivan works as an emergency physician in Chicago, traveling to Los Angeles occasionally to work in Hollywood.

Life and career
Ivan M. Raimi was born in Royal Oak, Michigan. He is third of five children born to  Celia Barbara (née Abrams), who owned lingerie shops, and Leonard Ronald Raimi, who owned home furnishing stores. Ivan was raised in Conservative Judaism, and his ancestors emigrated from Russia and Hungary. His sister remains in Michigan.  He is a graduate of Michigan State University and received his medical degree from the Des Moines University medical school in 1984. Raimi then completed an emergency medicine residency at the Southside Medical Center. He is dually board certified by the American Board of Internal Medicine and the American Osteopathic Board of Emergency Medicine.

Raimi sometimes collaborates on projects with brothers Sam Raimi and Ted Raimi, and his work Army of Darkness is the sequel to the horror films The Evil Dead and Evil Dead II. He also co-wrote the comic book adaption of Army for Dark Horse Comics. His work in the entertainment industry has been sparse due to his primary career as a doctor.

Prior to these successes, Dr. Raimi also contributed to several of the films that his brother Sam had made in his early career. Some of these were amateur efforts produced in suburban Michigan; some of them professional, theatrical efforts like Easy Wheels (though the script was heavily altered from the one the Raimis submitted). They also worked together on The Nutt House, which was, again, heavily altered—so much so that all those who worked on the script used pseudonyms. Raimi was credited as "Alan Smithee, Sr."

Raimi also co-wrote Darkman, a collaboration with Sam which also featured Ted.  He created the short-lived television series Spy Game and co-wrote the stories and screenplays for Spider-Man 3 and Drag Me to Hell, both projects directed by Sam Raimi and featuring Ted Raimi.

Filmography

Further reading
Warren, Bill. The Evil Dead Companion, pg. 141-2. 
Raimi, Sam. Army of Darkness DVD audio commentary.

References

External links

1956 births
American osteopathic physicians
American male screenwriters
Michigan State University alumni
American people of Hungarian-Jewish descent
American people of Russian-Jewish descent
Living people
People from Royal Oak, Michigan
Des Moines University alumni
Screenwriters from Michigan
Raimi family